Deborah R. Gilg (December 15, 1951 – November 16, 2022) was an American attorney who served as the United States Attorney for the District of Nebraska from 2009 to 2017.

Early life and education
Gilg was born on December 15, 1951, in Omaha, Nebraska. She received her Bachelor of Arts and Juris Doctor from the University of Nebraska.

Death
Gilg died on November 16, 2022 at the age of 70 after a short battle with colon cancer.

See also
 2017 dismissal of U.S. attorneys

References

1951 births
2022 deaths
Nebraska Democrats
United States Attorneys for the District of Nebraska
People from Omaha, Nebraska
University of Nebraska alumni
21st-century American lawyers
21st-century American women lawyers